This is a list of the equipment currently used by the Australian Army.

Armoured Vehicles

Utility, reconnaissance and support vehicles

Artillery

Air defence

Aircraft

Unmanned aerial vehicles

Watercraft

Infantry weapons

Assault rifles and carbines

Precision rifles

Machine guns

Pistols

Submachine guns

Shotguns

Grenade launchers

Anti-armour

Mortars

Grenades and anti personnel mines

Bayonets

Combat uniform of the Australian Army

There are two major combat uniforms worn by the Army, they are:

 Australian Multicam Camouflage Uniform – AMCU is the standard combat uniform with a camouflage pattern derived from Crye Precision MultiCam using a colour palette and shapes based on the previous Disruptive Pattern Camouflage Uniform (DPCU). The AMCU was initially issued in late 2014 to 3rd Brigade with a final design roll out commencing in January 2016. Uniforms in Multicam pattern had been adopted in 2009 starting with the Crye Precision Combat Uniform (CPCU) issued to special forces (Special Operations Task Group) in Afghanistan which was later issued to Mentoring Task Force close-combatant units. Domestically and in other Peacekeeping exercises the standard DPCU was worn. The CPCU was replaced in 2012 by the Australian Multicam Pattern - Operational Combat Uniform (AMP-OCU) made in Australia with a specially designed pattern for Afghanistan. The CPCU and the AMP-OCU had replaced the Disruptive Pattern Desert Uniform (DPDU). The DPDU was an Australian made and designed uniform issued in 2001 for Afghanistan and was later worn in Iraq with the design refined twice.
 Disruptive Pattern Camouflage Uniform – DPCU had been the standard combat uniform for the Army following its roll out in 1987 to replace the jungle green uniform. In 2005, the DPCU-NIR was released with Near-infrared (NIR) Signature Management Camouflage. The DPCU is being replaced by the AMCU.

Future equipment

Infantry weapons
The Army has begun to roll out their new state of the art rifle, the Enhanced F88 (EF88). The new rifle has several new features including improved modularity featuring extended accessories rail, a fixed barrel, bolt catch release and a black paint scheme. It was confirmed in July 2015 that the contract for 30,000 EF88 rifles had been approved with full roll out starting in 2016. 2,500 Steyr Mannlicher SL40 grenade launchers have also been ordered.

The Army had previously planned on replacing the F88 with the Advanced Individual Combat Weapon (AICW) by 2010–2012. The most notable feature of the AICW is a grenade launcher with 3 stacked rounds that uses electricity to fire off the grenade. The AICW had aimed to provide the infantry soldier with the ability to fire multiple grenades without having to reload, and to switch between 5.56 mm ballistic rounds and 40 mm grenades without changing sights, trigger or stance, giving the operator more versatility and reduced reaction times in combat. The AICW has all but disappeared from the Army's sights and it is unlikely to ever make a return. The company responsible for the ACIW, Metal Storm Limited was placed in voluntary administration in 2012.

Artillery
The 2016 Defence White Paper had earlier announced that the Army would acquire a long-range rocket system. The new system will be procured under LAND 8113 Phase 1. In May 2022, the US approved a Foreign Military Sale of 20 M142 High Mobility Artillery Rocket System (HIMARS) together with four different types of Guided Multiple Launch Rocket Systems (GMLRS) and an Army Tactical Missile System (ATACMS).

The US Army has reported that the M142 HIMARS will be able to fire the PrSM.

Under LAND 8116 Phase 1, the Army will acquire 30 AS9 Huntsman 155mm self-propelled howitzers based on the South Korean Hanwha K9 Thunder together with 15 AS10 Armoured Ammunition Resupply Vehicles (AARV) to be built in Geelong in Victoria with deliveries expected in 2025.

Air defence
In April 2017 the Australian Government awarded Raytheon a contract to produce an unspecified number of NASAMS 2 systems. The batteries, mounted on Hawkei PMVs, will be used by the 16th Regiment. 2 batteries were ordered on 21 June 2019.

Armoured vehicles
In December 2011, the Thales Hawkei PMV (Protected Military Vehicle) was selected as the preferred tender for the Army's requirement of a light 4x4 armored car with a potential order for 1300 vehicles. The seven-tonne Hawkei has been described as a 'baby' variant of the Bushmaster having been developed by the same manufacturer.

Under LAND 400 the ASLAV and M113s will be replaced, with the project to acquire a Combat Reconnaissance Vehicle (CRV), an Infantry Fighting Vehicle (IFV), a Manoeuvre Support Vehicle (MSV) and an Integrated Training System (ITS). The ASLAV fleet is planned to be replaced from 2020, and the M113s from 2025. On 19 February 2015 the tender was opened for the replacement of the ASLAV, listing a requirement for up to 225 armored vehicles to provide the future mounted combat reconnaissance capability. The remaining requirements of the project will be confirmed by the upcoming Defence White Paper; however, it is expected to include an infantry fighting vehicle—a capability currently only partly provided by the in-service M113AS4 Armoured Personnel Carrier—as well as a manoeuvre support vehicle, and an integrated training system. The project is valued at more than $10 billion and is expected to acquire approximately 700 vehicles.

Under LAND 907 Phase 2 the M1A1 Abrams will be upgraded to the M1A2 through replacement. In January 2022, the government announced that the Army will acquire 75 M1A2 SEPv3 Abrams and six M88A2 Hercules recovery vehicles which will be delivered from 2024. Under Land 8160 Phase 1, the Army is reviving the Combat Engineering Vehicle capability lost with the Leopard tanks and will acquire twenty-nine M1150 Assault Breacher Vehicles and seventeen M1074 Joint Assault Bridges to be delivered from 2024.

Aircraft
The Army is replacing its fleet of ARH Tiger attack and MRH-90 Taipan utility helicopters earlier than planned. The ARH Tiger was scheduled to receive a A$1–2 billion mid-life upgrade in the late 2010s and was planned to be operated into the 2030s. The 2016 Defence White Paper stated the Tiger would be replaced in the mid-2020s and cancelled the mid-life upgrade instead the Tiger is to receive a A$500–750 million upgrade. In January 2021, under LAND 4503 Phase 1 the government announced that the Army will purchase 29 Boeing AH-64E Apache Guardian to replace the 22 Tigers from 2025. In January 2014, the Army commenced retiring the fleet of 34 S-70A-9 Black Hawks from service and had planned for this to be completed by June 2018 to be replaced by 41 MRH-90 Taipans. The Chief of Army delayed the retirement of 22 Black Hawks until 2021 for the 6th Aviation Regiment due to issues operating the MRH-90 in a special operations role. On 10 December 2021, the Black Hawk was retired from service. On the same day, amid issues with the MRH-90 Taipans the Australian government announced that they would be replaced by up to 40 UH-60M Black Hawks. The MRH-90 was planned to be retired in 2037.

Summary 
This list includes equipment currently on order or a requirement which has been identified:

 LAND 4503 Phase 1 is set to replace the Tiger ARH helicopter with the Boeing AH-64E Guardian helicopter.
 A new deployable short-range ground-based air defence missile system is slated to replace the RBS-70 MANPADS by the early 2020s.
 Land-based anti-ship missiles were outlined as a new requirement in the 2016 Defence White Paper to defend deployed forces as well as offshore assets such as oil and natural gas platforms.
 The Australian Government committed to improving the systems that individual soldiers use. Items outlined in the DWP include "weapons and targeting equipment, digital communications systems, body armour and self protection equipment (including for chemical, biological and radiological threats), and night fighting equipment."
 1,100 Hawkei protected mobility vehicles are currently being procured at a cost of around $1.3 billion.
 The Bushmaster PMV is to be replaced beginning in 2025 by a new platform.
 LAND 400 Phase 2 replacement program is set to replace the existing 257 ASLAVs with 211 Boxers.
 LAND 400 Phase 3 replacement program is set to replace 431 M113AS3/4 APCs.
 LAND 907 Phase 2 replacement program is set to replace the M1A1 Abrams with M1A2s.
 LAND 8113 Phase 1 will acquire a long-range rocket artillery and missile system. The US has approved the sale of the M142 HIMARS.
 A riverine patrol capability is to be re-established in 2022. The capability will be established around a fleet of small, lightly armed patrol vessels to allow access to a range of different environments.
 The Army has outlined a need for enhanced intelligence, surveillance and reconnaissance capability. With this, they plan to acquire a fleet of armed, medium-range unmanned aerial vehicles along with regular capability updates. They will provide enhanced firepower and ISR as well as a counter-terrorism ability overseas. They will also assist in humanitarian and relief missions.
 LAND 8116 Phase 1 will acquire AS9 Huntsman 155mm self-propelled howitzers.
 Up to 40 UH-60M Black Hawks will be acquired the Minister for Defence announced in December 2021.

References

External links

Manufacturing process of the F88 rifle – Army News, 6 September 2007.

Army
 
Australia
Army
Equipment